Richard Choruma (23 November 1978 – 29 December 2020) was a Zimbabwean football winger.

Choruma died on 29 December 2020 from kidney failure.

References

1978 births
2020 deaths
Zimbabwean footballers
Zimbabwe international footballers
Dynamos F.C. players
Highlanders F.C. players
Bloemfontein Celtic F.C. players
Association football wingers
South African Premier Division players
Zimbabwean expatriate footballers
Expatriate soccer players in South Africa
Zimbabwean expatriate sportspeople in South Africa
Deaths from kidney failure